The Bangladesh National Film Award for Best Costume Design is one of the highest film awards in Bangladesh. Since 2008, the awards have been given in the category of best choreography. The first award winner was Mohammad Shasmsul Islam. No awardees have since won multiple awards in this category. Females have taken 5 out of all 8 awards given in this category.

List of winners

References

Costume
National Film Awards (Bangladesh)